Shiba Sonome (1664–1726, 斯波 園女) was a Japanese zen poet. She was an acquaintance and friend of Matsuo Bashō, and their correspondence is a treasure of zen and haiku history. On a final visit in 1694, Bashō paid homage to her in a haiku, hiragiku no me ni tatete miru chiri mo nashi, 白菊の目に立てゝ見る塵もなし, in the eye of a white chrysanthemum, there is not a speck of dust.

Sonome was known for the purity of her spirit and her poetry, which possessed a frank and immediate sense of purpose. Her published works include, Kiku no Chiri, 菊の塵, Dust on Chrysanthemums.

References

External links

Japanese poets
1664 births
1726 deaths
Japanese Zen Buddhists
Japanese writers of the Edo period
Japanese haiku poets